New Bridge was a prosperous mill hamlet, centered upon a bridge strategically placed at the narrows of the Hackensack River. In the American Revolution, New Bridge Landing was the site of a strategic bridge crossing the Hackensack River, where General George Washington led his troops in retreat from British forces November 20, 1776. Eleven engagements took place here throughout the war. The current Draw Bridge at New Bridge was installed in 1889 and added to the National Register of Historic Places on July 5, 1989. The area is now a New Jersey historic site in portions of New Milford, River Edge, Hackensack and Teaneck in Bergen County, New Jersey, United States.

History 
New Bridge was settled by the Bergen Dutch, an agricultural community whose language and culture blended contributions from Dutch, Angolan African, German, English, French, Scotch and Scandinavian settlers.

At a place known originally as Aschatking (where the river narrows), about ten miles above the head of Newark Bay, a Swedish land-clearer named Cornelius Mattyse acquired 420 acres at the juncture of Tantaqua's Creek (Cole's Brook) and the Hackensack River, in 1682. This was called Tantaqua's Plain, where a Hackensack sachem of that name resided with his kinfolk. David Ackerman, residing in the village of Hackensack, purchased the land from Matheus Corneliuson, son of Cornelius Matheus of Hackinsack River, in 1695. He devised that portion of this tract of land lying east of Kinderkamack Road to his son, Johannes Ackerman, who built a dwelling on the Steenrapie (Kinderkamack) Road at the time of his marriage to Jannetje Lozier in 1713.

A tidal gristmill was built on the Hackensack River. This mill got its power from an artificial pond: the high tide was trapped in the mouth of Cole's Brook by a dam with a special drop-gate, suspended from a horizontal timber. When the tides flowed out of the Hackensack River, the tidal millpond was slowly released through the waterwheel. Sloops pulled alongside the mill at New Bridge Landing. On March 9, 1744, a road was surveyed from Kinderkamack Road to the narrows of the Hackensack River where a "New Bridge" was to be erected (forming was is now Main Street, River Edge).

Jan and Annetje (Ackerman) Zabriskie purchased the Johannes Ackerman mill and farm in September 1745, shortly after construction of the first draw-bridge at the narrows of the Hackensack River. This wooden span was called New Bridge to distinguish it from an older crossing  miles upstream at Old Bridge. In 1752, Jan Zabriskie built the oldest part of the Steuben House. The Zabriskies grew wealthy from increased trade brought on by the French and Indian War (1756-1763).

New Bridge Landing was the business center of the upper Hackensack Valley - the shopping mall of its day. Iron made in stone furnaces along the Ramapo Mountains was carried in ox-carts to New Bridge Landing where it was loaded onto boats for shipment to market. Flour and animal feed was shipped from the mill. All kinds of wares came in from boats returning from the city. This location had an added advantage: because of the wide Hackensack Meadowlands downstream, New Bridge remained the nearest river crossing to Newark Bay until 1790. Overland traffic including farm wagons and stage coaches, going to and from New York City, crossed the river at this spot on their way into the interior parts of the country.

The Great Retreat 
After losses in the Battle of Brooklyn, General George Washington led his troops towards Manhattan, with the British in pursuit. On November 16, 1776, Fort Washington in Upper Manhattan fell to the British, and Washington evacuated Fort Lee on the other side the  North River (Hudson River).

In the early morning hours of November 20, 1776, Lieutenant General Charles Cornwallis led a British and Hessian army of about 5,000 soldiers across the Hudson to New Dock into New Jersey for an attack against Fort Lee, then defended by about 2,500-3,000 soldiers. Washington met Greene in the vicinity of the Liberty Pole in Englewood to lead his troops in a retreat through present-day Fort Lee, Englewood and Teaneck across the Hackensack River at New Bridge. The hasty withdrawal of the American garrison across the Hackensack River at New Bridge preserved them from entrapment on the Bergen Neck, the narrow piece of land between the Hudson and Hackensack Rivers. They continued westward, crossing the Passaic River on the Acquakanonk Bridge, which was dismantled.

Map published by the Bergen County Historical Society shows how close Washington came to being entrapped.  He continued his retreat through early December, passing through Princeton and Trenton on the way towards and across the Delaware River into Pennsylvania.

According to tradition, Thomas Paine composed the first tract of The American Crisis - a series of essays intended to rally American resolve during the darkest hours of the war - at Newark using a drumhead for a desk and a campfire for illumination. Published on December 19, 1776, only six days before Washington's victory at Trenton reversed the declining fortunes of the Continental cause, Paine stirred hopes with his immortal refrain. Noted here is the section that refers to New Bridge:

Such was our situation and condition at Fort Lee on the morning of November 20, when an officer arrived with information that the enemy with 200 boats had landed about seven miles above. Major General Green, who commanded the garrison, immediately ordered them under arms, and sent express to General Washington at the town of Hackensack, distant by way of the ferry six miles.

Our first object was to secure the bridge over the Hackensack, which laid up the river between the enemy and us, about six miles from us, and three from them. General Washington arrived in about three quarters of an hour, and marched at the head of the troops towards the bridge, which place I expected we should have a brush for; however, they did not choose to dispute it with us, and the greatest part of our troops went over the bridge, the rest over the ferry, except some which passed at a mill on a small creek, between the bridge and the ferry, and made their way through some marshy grounds up to the town of Hackensack, and there passed the river. We brought off as much baggage as the wagons could contain, the rest was lost. The simple object was to bring off the garrison and march them on till they could be strengthened by the Jersey and Pennsylvania militia, so as to be enabled to make a stand. We staid four days at Newark, collected our outposts with some of the Jersey militia, and marched out twice to meet the enemy, on being informed that they were advancing, though our numbers were greatly inferior to theirs.

The British failure to capture the American garrison at Fort Lee, and perhaps defeat the American rebellion, was a consequence of self-confident British officers not realizing, despite reminders from local Loyalists, that "New Bridge was the key to the peninsula between the Hackensack and the Hudson."

While a constant arena for conflict, the following significant Revolutionary War events are associated with New Bridge:

 British troops under Major General Vaughan attacked the American rear guard on November 21, 1776, and seized the New Bridge, which American engineers were dismantling.
 British and Loyalist troops under command of Captain Patrick Fergusen attacked about 40 Bergen militiamen at New Bridge on May 18, 1779.
 Major Henry Lee led American troops from New Bridge on August 18, 1779, to attack the British earthworks at Paulus Hook.
 A force of Bergen Militia and Continental troops attacked 600 British troops and German auxiliaries at New Bridge on their retreat from Hackensack and Paramus on March 23, 1780, during the two hours it took for the British to repair and cross the New Bridge.
 A body of 312 British, Loyalist and German infantry, attacked and overwhelmed an American outpost at New Bridge commanded by Lieutenant Bryson on April 15, 1780.
 Eight British soldiers were killed and several wounded, by friendly fire when British troops attempted to attack a body of Bergen Militia in the Zabriskie-Steuben House at New Bridge on May 30, 1780.
 Brigadier General Anthony Wayne led American troops from New Bridge on a raid against the blockhouse at Bull's Ferry on July 20, 1780.
 General Washington made his headquarters in the Zabriskie-Steuben House during the Steenrapie encampment of the Continental Army, encompassing nearly 14,000 men, on September 4–20, 1780.

Historic homes 

On December 23, 1783, in gratitude for his service to the Continental Army, the State of New Jersey presented use of a house, mill and the surrounding areas to Major-General Friedrich Wilhelm von Steuben. The house had been confiscated from Jan Zabriskie, a Loyalist, in 1781. This gift was one of many grants of land von Steuben received from several states in thanks for his efforts in training the Continental Army. This estate is considered to be the most valuable and is now known as the Steuben House.

The Steuben House Commission was created in 1926 to purchase Baron Steuben's home at New Bridge. The Steuben House was renovated and opened as a public museum in September 1939 displaying period artifacts belonging to the Bergen County Historical Society. The Bergen County was invited to make its headquarters at the Steuben House at that time. The Steuben House, listed on the New Jersey and National Register of Historic Places, is under the jurisdiction of the Historic New Bridge Landing Park Commission. The Steuben House is a state-historic site.

The Historic New Bridge Landing Park Commission was established by legislation (P. L. 1995, Chapter 260, powers expanded by P. L. 2009, Chapter 45) to coordinate and implement governmental and private development policies and other activities incidental to the preservation, maintenance, restoration and interpretation of the historic riverfront village surrounding New Bridge, so as to optimize its educational and recreational benefit to the public.

Since this historic neighborhood spans the Hackensack River at the intersection of four municipalities (namely, River Edge, New Milford, Teaneck, and Hackensack), the Commission provides an intercommunicative forum to inform and coordinate decisions made by diverse public and private entities having ownership of properties within the commission's jurisdiction. The Bergen County Historical Society, non-profit volunteer organization, is a member and lead force of the commission, is the largest landowner and volunteers provide all programming.

The house is now the cornerstone of a historic site. Other threatened historic homes, including the Campbell-Christie House and the Demarest House Museum were moved from New Milford and the Westervelt-Thomas Barn, from Washington Township, have been relocated onto BCHS property for preservation. BCHS constructed a working out-kitchen.

The April 2007 Nor'easter caused damage to the Steuben home and the historic artifacts housed there.

New Bridge Landing station
The New Bridge Landing station on the New Jersey Transit Pascack Valley Line was named in 2008 to honor the site and return the historical name to the area.

See also
New Jersey during the American Revolution
Fort Lee Historic Park
English Neighborhood
Burdett's Landing
National Register of Historic Places listings in Bergen County, New Jersey
Raritan Landing, New Jersey
List of crossings of the Hackensack River

References

Bibliography

External links 
Bergen County Historical Society history of the Steuben House
 BCHS Mobile Ap Walking Tour of HNBL
Historic New Bridge Landing Park Commission

Hackensack, New Jersey
New Milford, New Jersey
River Edge, New Jersey
Teaneck, New Jersey
New Jersey in the American Revolution
Geography of Bergen County, New Jersey
Museums in Bergen County, New Jersey
Open-air museums in New Jersey
Hackensack River
New Bridge Landing
New Bridge Landing
New Bridge Landing
New Bridge Landing
New Bridge Landing
Parks in Bergen County, New Jersey
New Bridge Landing